The Cape Verde national handball team is the national handball team of Cape Verde.

Cape Verde qualified for the 2021 World Championship after placing fifth in their first participation in the African Championship. But they had to withdraw from the tournament, after not having the minimum of players available, due to several cases of players who tested positive for COVID-19. The team qualified to the 2023 World Championship after beating Angola in the quarterfinals of the African tournament.

Results

World Championship
2021 – 32nd place
2023 – 23rd place

African Championship
2020 – 5th place
2022 – 2nd place

Current squad
Squad for the 2023 World Men's Handball Championship.

Head coach:  Ljubomir Obradović

References

External links
IHF profile

Men's national handball teams
National sports teams of Cape Verde
Handball in Cape Verde